Science City station, is a station of  Line 21 of the Guangzhou Metro. It started operations on 20 December 2019.

The station has an underground island platform. Platform 1 is for trains heading to Zengcheng Square, whilst platform 2 is for trains heading to Yuancun.

Exits
There are 3 exits, lettered A1, B1 and B1. Exit C1 is accessible. Exits A1 and B1 are located on Science Avenue, whilst exit C1 is located on Kaitai Avenue.

Gallery

References

Railway stations in China opened in 2019
Guangzhou Metro stations in Huangpu District